Linda L. Brenneman (born October 13, 1965, in Wheat Ridge, Colorado) is a road cyclist from the United States. She represented her nation at the 1996 Summer Olympics in the women's road race and women's time trial.

References

American female cyclists
Cyclists at the 1996 Summer Olympics
Olympic cyclists of the United States
Living people
People from Wheat Ridge, Colorado
1965 births
21st-century American women